The 1825 Massachusetts gubernatorial election was held on April 4.

Governor William Eustis died in February, leaving Lieutenant Governor Marcus Morton, a Jacksonian Republican, to fill the seat on an acting basis.

In the general election, Levi Lincoln Jr., an Adams Republican, had no organized opposition.

General election

Candidates
Levi Lincoln Jr., Associate Justice of the Massachusetts Supreme Judicial Court (Adams Republican)

Results

References

Governor
1825
Massachusetts
November 1825 events